Paweł Giel (born 8 December 1989) is a Polish former footballer who played as a midfielder.

Career
He used to play in the Ekstraklasa with GKS Bełchatów.

After retiring from football in the summer of 2020, Giel found employment as a paramedic, and is considered a front-line worker during the COVID-19 pandemic.

References

External links

1989 births
Living people
People from Tarnowskie Góry
Polish footballers
Association football midfielders
Ruch Radzionków players
Ekstraklasa players
GKS Bełchatów players
Sportspeople from Silesian Voivodeship
Stal Rzeszów players